Jerzy Zawieyski, born Henryk Nowicki, (2 October 1902, Radogoszcz, Piotrków Governorate – 18 June 1969, Warsaw) was a Polish playwright, prose writer, Catholic political activist and amateur stage actor. He wrote psychological, social, moral and historical novels, dramas, stories, essays and journals.

As a secretary of the Towarzystwo Uniwersytetów Robotniczych, he did organizing work for the workers' educational and theatrical movement. Then he was an activist of the Związek Młodzieży Wiejskiej Rzeczypospolitej Polskiej. During the German occupation of Poland, he was active in the underground cultural movement.

Biography

In 1921, Zawieyski made his debut with poems (Strzępy) under the pseudonym Konar-Nowicki. In 1926, he graduated from the School of Drama in Kraków. From 1926 to 1928, he was an actor at the Reduta Theatre and editor of the magazine Teatr Ludowy. From 1929 to 1931, he was staying in France, where he worked as an instructor of Polonia amateur drama groups. After returning to Poland, until 1939, he worked as the director of the Instytut Teatrów Ludowych (Institute for Folklore Theaters), actor and literary manager of the Ataneum Theatre. In his youth, Zawieyski had been an atheist and did not convert to Catholicism until the 1930s.

After World War II, Zawieyski worked as a lecturer at the Catholic University of Lublin (Katolicki Uniwersytet Lubelski, KUL). He co-founded the Klub Inteligencji Katolickiej, whose president he was until 1957. He was a member of the editorial boards of Tygodnik Powszechny (From 1946 until 1952, and again from 1956) and Znak (1946–1951 and from 1957). In 1949, he was awarded by the Polish episcopate. In 1957–1969, he was a member of the Sejm of the People's Republic of Poland. In 1957–1968, he was a member of the Polish Council of State.

Zawieyski was homosexual. In 1933 he met Stanisław Trębaczkiewicz. They fell in love and lived together until Zawieyski's death in 1969. They were buried next to each other in the Laski Cemetery near Warsaw.

Notable works

 Novels
 Gdzie jesteś, przyjacielu (1932)
 Daleko do rana (1932)
 Droga do domu (1946)
 Wawrzyny i cyprysy (1966)
 Konrad nie chce zejść ze sceny (1966)

 Dramas
 Dyktator Faust
 Powrót Przełęckiego
 Mąż doskonały
 Rozdroże miłości
 Rzeka niedoli (1953)
 Tyrteusz
 Pożegnanie z Salomeą

 Stories
 Romans z ojczyzną (1963)

 Essays
 Próby ognia i czasu (1958)
 Pomiędzy plewą i manną (1971)
 Droga katechumena (1971)

 Film scenarios
 Prawdziwy koniec wielkiej wojny (1957)
 Odwiedziny prezydenta (1961)

 Memoirs
 Dobrze, że byli (1974)
 Kartki z dziennika 1955-1969 (1983)

References
 Inline

 General

Further reading
 
 
 
 
 
 
 

1902 births
1969 deaths
Writers from Łódź
People from Piotrków Governorate
Polish Roman Catholics
Znak (association) members
Members of the Polish Sejm 1961–1965
Members of the Polish Sejm 1965–1969
Academic staff of the John Paul II Catholic University of Lublin
Polish LGBT poets
Polish LGBT politicians
Polish LGBT dramatists and playwrights
Polish gay actors
Polish gay writers
Polish essayists
Polish memoirists
Roman Catholic writers
20th-century Polish poets
Polish male stage actors
Gay politicians
Gay dramatists and playwrights
Gay poets
Gay memoirists
20th-century Polish dramatists and playwrights
Male essayists
Polish male dramatists and playwrights
Polish male poets
20th-century essayists
20th-century Polish male writers
20th-century Polish journalists
20th-century memoirists
20th-century Polish LGBT people